Peddannayya  is a 1997 Telugu-language drama film directed by Sarath and produced by Nandamuri Ramakrishna under Ramakrishna Horticultural Cine Studios. It stars Nandamuri Balakrishna, Roja and Indraja, with music composed by Koti. The film was recorded as a blockbuster at the box office.

Plot
The film begins with Ramakrishna Prasad a supreme authority of the terrain who holds a family feud with malevolent Bhaskar Rayudu a big gun. The two used to be besties in the past. Ramakrishna is paterfamilias to his conscientious joint family. All he cares for is his 3 cousins Sai Prasad, Durga Prasad, & Bhavani Prasad, and their mother. Plus, they too esteem him as a deity. Seeta Mahalakshmi is a plucky woman patiently waiting to knit Ramakrishna for 15 years. Since he pledged to be unmarried until his siblings settle. Even she too swears not to burn until he ties a knot. Besides, Bhavani is a cheerful naughty medico who squabbles with his colleague Sravani.

Apart from this, Durga loves vainglory woman Neelaveni, the daughter of Bhaskar Rayudu's sidekick Advocate Chenchuramaiah. So, they collude by wedlock the two birds to create a rift in the family which fails because of their idealization bondage. In the interim, Bhaskar Rayudu scams a govt project by constructing an inferiority structure in which Durga is also involved. Being conscious of it, Ramakrishna upbraids his brother, gets him to resign, and pays Bhaskar Rayudu back the looted amount. Meanwhile, Bhavani endears Sravani despite learning she is grown up at a prostitute's house who is going to scapegoat soon. As it happens, he has to espouse her with immediate effect for guarding against evils without the knowledge of his elder brother. Utilizing it, Chenchuramaiah sets fire to the family. Though Ramakrishna appreciates & aids Bhavani's deed he backs it because of the remaining refusal. Presently, Bhavani quits and shelters at their farmhouse.

After a while, the brutal snares Sai & Durga build a factory where Bhavani resides. Ramakrishna hinders it which leads to the splitting of the property. Accordingly, Ramakrishna keeps the maximum share for the safety of his brothers. Hither, Sai & Durga are blind to gaze at his intention and vilify him but he thresholds with patience. Parallelly, Bhaskar Rayudu allows shares to the public in the factory and accumulates  from them. At that point, Sai consigned to deposit the amount which is stolen, and Bhavani is incriminated. Hence, Ramakrishna repays the amount by selling the share of his brothers. It begrudges Sai & Durga to accuse him, also resisting his entrance into the house when their mother rebukes, proclaims the eminence of Ramakrishna and spins rearward.

Once, Ramakrishna & Seeta are sweet lovers who are going to espouse in a little while. At that time, Rama Krishna's sister Parvati is conceived by the betrayal of Bhaskar Rayudu's brother Ravindra which leads to her suicide. Hence, the infuriated Ramakrishna slaughters Ravindra in that attack Ramakrishna's uncle dies entrusting his infants to him. Thus, Ramakrishna affirmed to make them worthy. Listening to it, the family regrets and pleads for pardon from their elder brother. Further, they proceed to retrieve Bhavani & Sravani when he keeps a condition that Ramakrishna should unite with Seeta which he agrees. At that time, Bhaskar Rayudu & Chenchuramaiah cabal by garroting Seeta poses it as a suicide and indicts Ramakrishna. Currently, Ramakrishna knots the wedding chain to Seeta's blank body to fulfill her vow. During her funeral, the police apprehend Ramakrishna. Side by side, backstabbed Chenchuramaiah & Neelaveni by Bhaskar Rayudu grounds therein having a close call. Before dying, Chenchuramaiah affirms the actuality with conscience-stricken when Bhaskar Rayudu onslaughts on them. At last, Ramakrishna & Bhavani ceases the baddies. Finally, the movie ends with gravely wounded Ramakrishna taking self-immolation with Seeta.

Cast

 Nandamuri Balakrishna as Rama Krishna Prasad & Bhavani Prasad (Dual role)
 Roja as Sita Mahalakshmi
 Indraja as Shravani
 Subhashri as Neelaveni
 Kota Srinivasa Rao as Chenchuramaiah
 Charanraj as Bhaskar Rayudu
 Srihari as Bhaskar Rayudu's son
 Brahmanandam as Principal
 Sudhakar as Bhaskar Rayudu's brother-in-law
 Vijaya Rangaraju as Bombula Bal Reddy
 Chalapathi Rao
 M.Balayya as Rama Krishna's Father/Babai
 Achyuth as Sai Prasad
 Raj Kumar as Durga Prasad
 Raja Ravindra as Ravindra
 Rajiv Kanakala
 Prasad Babu as Police Inspector
 Ananth Babu as Bhavani Prasad's friend
 Annapoorna as Rama Krishna Prasad's mother/pinni
 Lathasri as Sulochana
 Rajitha
 Krishnaveni
 Aalapati Lakshmi as Bhaskar Rayudu's wife

Soundtrack

The music for the film was composed by Koti and released on Shiva Musicals Company.

Reception 
The film was reviewed by Zamin Ryot. A critic from Andhra Today wrote that "A movie full of sentiments of upholding traditional extended family structure and has great appeal for the masses. Almost in imitation of his father and movie legend NTR, Balakrishna indulges in a lot of platitudes and histrionics".

References

External links
 

 Watch movies online

1997 films
Films directed by Sarath
Films scored by Koti
Indian action drama films
1990s masala films
1990s Telugu-language films
1990s action drama films